MS Renaissance is a cruise ship scheduled to re-enter service as the in February 2023. The ship was built in Italy in 1992 as Maasdam for Holland America Line. While sailing for Holland America, the vessel operated primarily in North American waters. In 2020 she was bought by Seajets and renamed Aegean Myth, but did not trade. The ship was bought in 2022 by a new French operator, Compagnie Française de Croisières and sent for refit.

Design and description
As Maasdam, the ship featured a teak promenade deck and her interior motifs paid homage to the Dutch East India Company and the Dutch West India Company. The centerpiece of the ship's atrium was a sculpture crafted by Luciano Vistosi and featured over 2,000 pieces of glass. Other pieces of ancient artifacts and art pieces were also spread throughout the ship.

Construction

Maasdam was a member of Holland America's , otherwise known as S class. She was ordered in November 1989 alongside two sister ships of her class, and was designated hull number 5882. Her keel was laid by Fincantieri in early 1992. Throughout 1992 and 1993, the ship was completed and underwent sea trials, and on 3 December 1993, Maasdam was christened by actress June Allyson at Port Everglades, Florida. Upon her maiden voyage into the Caribbean Sea, she became the fifth Holland America Line ship to bear the name Maasdam.

During her early planning and architectural design phases, there were concerns that Maasdam and the S class would not be in compliance with specific vessel stability requirements mandated by SOLAS 90. The hull design of Maasdam and her sister ships are largely based on Costa Classica, a ship operated by sister brand Costa Cruises. These fears were alleviated, however, following the successful sea trials of the class's lead ship, MS Statendam.

Holland America LineMaasdam served different regions of the world based on the seasons during her tenure at Holland America. During winter months, she cruised to the Caribbean from Port Everglades. During the summer season, she sailed from Boston, Massachusetts to Europe, Atlantic Canada and New England.

In 2006, Maasdam underwent dry dock renovations at Grand Bahama Shipyard in Freeport, Grand Bahama. In 2011, Maasdam underwent dry dock renovations at Grand Bahama Shipyard in Freeport, Grand Bahama which increased her passenger capacity.

In December 2016, she visited Oceania, where she undertook voyages from New Zealand.

On 7 November 2018, during a 'Polynesian & South Seas Sampler' cruise, a 70-year-old female American passenger fell between the ship's Deck 3 tender platform and one of the ship's tenders. She was crushed, and she fell into the waters off of Rarotonga, Cook Islands and was later pronounced dead on board the same day. Maasdam returned to Rarotonga a few days later, but despite much calmer seas, Captain Ryan Whitaker canceled all tender operations.

In December 2019, the New Zealand Youth Choir used the Maasdam as a way to complete a planned South Pacific tour. The choir boarded Maasdam in Auckland, and gave several concerts aboard the ship, as well as at ports of call including Tonga, Fiji, New Caledonia and Sydney. 

On 19 March 2020, 842 guests and 542 crew members on board Maasdam were barred from disembarkation in Honolulu, Hawaii due to fears surrounding COVID-19. The ship was allowed to take on appropriate provisions and supplies, however, and began a return journey to the Port of San Diego for debarkation.

Due to the COVID-19 pandemic, Holland America suspended its cruise operations through 30 June 2020, and sailings aboard Maasdam were cancelled. The following month it was announced that the ship was sold to Piraeus-based ferry oprator Seajets, and she was laid up in Greece.

Compagnie Française de Croisières
In September 2022, after 2 years laid up, the ship was purchased by the newly-formed cruise line Compagnie Française de Croisières and renamed Renaissance''. CFC intend to reduce her capacity from 1,258 passengers to 1,100 passengers, served by 560 crew, with a launch date in February 2023 from Le Havre, France. In October the ship was sent to Damen Shipyards Brest for refit.

References

External links
 
 Holland America Line Maasdam former official site
 

Ships of the Holland America Line
Ships of Seajets
Ships built in Monfalcone
Ships built by Fincantieri
1992 ships
Maritime incidents in 2018
Passenger ships of France